Pearce may refer to:

Places
Pearce, Australian Capital Territory, a suburb
Division of Pearce, an electoral division in Western Australia
Pearce, Arizona, United States, an unincorporated community
RAAF Base Pearce, the main Royal Australian Air Force air base in Western Australia
RCAF Station Pearce, a Second World War training base in Alberta, Canada

People and fictional characters
Pearce (given name)
Pearce (surname)

See also
J.J. Pearce High School in Richardson, Texas
Pearse (disambiguation)
Pierce (disambiguation)
Peirce (disambiguation)